Robert Kendrick was the defending champion but decided not to participate.
Izak van der Merwe won the title, defeating Jesse Levine 4–6, 6–3, 6–4 in the final.

Seeds

Draw

Finals

Top half

Bottom half

References
 Main Draw
 Qualifying Draw

Virginia National Bank Men's Pro Championship - Singles
2011 Singles